Darin De Paul is an American voice actor known for his video game performances as Dr. Samuel Hayden / Seraphim in Doom and Doom Eternal, Reinhardt in Overwatch, Ardyn Izunia in Final Fantasy XV, Revenant in Apex Legends and Emperor Valkorion in Star Wars: The Old Republic.

Filmography

Film

Animation

Video games

Live-action

References

External links
 Official website
 
 

Living people
American male film actors
American male musical theatre actors
American male television actors
American male video game actors
American male voice actors
20th-century American male actors
21st-century American male actors
Place of birth missing (living people)
Year of birth missing (living people)